Villain is a 2013 Bengali film directed by Tota Roy Choudhury.Starring Tota Roy Chowdhury and Rituparna Sengupta.Tota Roy Choudhury made his debut by this film under his home production Trident Lord. The film released on 5 October 2013.

Plot
Arnab is an honest and upright PWD road inspector. Things take a turn after authorities frame corruption charges against him and send him to jail. Meanwhile, his wife also gets killed. A victimized Arnab now on a mission to avenge the culprits who changed his life.

Cast
 Tota Roy Chowdhury as Arnab
 Rituparna Sengupta as Anjali, Arnab's Wife
 Barkha Sengupta as Laila
 Rishi Kaushik as DCP Debashis Roy, Police Officer
 Rajatava Dutta as MLA Shivshankar
 Laboni Sarkar as Landlady
 Biswajit Chakraborty as Police Commissioner
 Sagnik Chatterjee as Raju, Shivshankar's younger brother 
  Sudip Mukherjee as Sultan Bhai, Prisoner in Jail 
 Sumit Ganguly as Inspector Rajesh
 Rajat Ganguly as Jailor
 Shantanu Das
 Arijit Roy
 Suraj Sheikh

Soundtrack

References

External links
 

2013 films
Bengali-language Indian films
2010s Bengali-language films